Bidur is the capital of Nuwakot District in Bagmati Province, Nepal. At the time of the 1991 Nepal census it had a population of 18694 and had 3736 houses in it.

In February 2008, terrorists damaged the town's water supply plant.

Economy 
In 2020 the first part of the biggest solar power station in Nepal (Nuwakot Solar Power Station) was connected to the electric grid. The solar plant is located next to Devighat Hydropower Station.

How to reach
Here we can reach by taking a local bus/deluxe bus from the capital city of Nepal -Kathmandu. It is about 70 Kilometres through the hilly terrain from the Balaju to Trishuli- one of the places of Bidur Municipality.

Media 
To promote local culture Bidur has three community radio stations. They are Radio Trishuli 88.4 MHz 010560789, Image weekly 010561678, TV Trishuli 010560181, 9851093290 Trishuli Prawaha weekly 9851002938, Khabarpage.com 9851093290, Radio Jalapa 9851080122

2015 Nepal earthquake
During the earthquake on 25 April 2015, a 37-year-old resident of Bidur named Shiva Shrestha was buried in a landslide and was rescued alive 98 hours afterwards. He was on his way to a picnic with fourteen of his friends, eleven of whom were buried during the massive landslide. Shrestha sustained several injuries on the head and body, and said he survived by drinking muddy water.

After the earthquake, Bidur is still in the phase of rebuilding. Due to a lack of concerned focus on re-establishment, it is late in the process.

School
There are several government and private schools in Bidur. Recently, with the advent of Christianity, some Christian-based schools have also been opened, especially in the Colony area.

References

 Populated places in Nuwakot District
 Municipalities in Bagmati Province
 Nepal municipalities established in 1986